The 1940 Mississippi Southern Southerners football team was an American football team that represented Mississippi Southern College (now known as the University of Southern Mississippi) as a member of the Southern Intercollegiate Athletic Association during the 1940 college football season. In their fourth year under head coach Reed Green, the team compiled a 7–4 record.

Schedule

References

Mississippi Southern
Southern Miss Golden Eagles football seasons
Mississippi Southern Southerners football